Issa Abdul Salam Abu-Issa (born 20 September 1955) is a business magnate from Qatar. He is the chairman and chief executive officer of Salam International Investment Limited. He was ranked 43rd in the Arabian Business Qatar Power List 2012.

Education and career
Abu Issa studied in and obtained a Bachelor of Science degree in Business Administration in 1978 from the United States International University in San Diego, California, United States.

On the international front, he holds membership in the World Economic Forum  and The Arab Business Council.

Salam International Investment Limited (SIIL)

Under Abu Issa's leadership, SIIL has experienced much growth and development. In 2006, due to the rise of capital and expansion, the company planned to build new office buildings and towers in Lusail. In 2009, SIIL planned to pick up a stake in the Jumana Tower building at The Pearl-Qatar. The company recently planned to establish a new investment bank in Lebanon along with other shareholders with a $30 million capital.

It has been recently voted as one of Forbes Middle East’s Top 200 companies in the Middle East Region.

References

1955 births
Living people
Qatari businesspeople
Qatari chief executives
Qatari people of Palestinian descent